Zisk is a surname. Notable people with the surname include:

Craig Zisk (born 1950), American director and producer, brother of Randall
Randall Zisk, American television director and producer
Richie Zisk (born 1949), American baseball player

See also
Lisk